Bonifácio Piccinini S.D.B.  (13 May 1929 – 28 November 2020) was a Brazilian Roman Catholic archbishop.

Piccinini was born in Brazil and was ordained to the priesthood in 1960. He served as titular archbishop of Turres in Byzacena and as coadjutor archbishop of the Roman Catholic Archdiocese of Cuiabá Brazil, from 1975 to 1981 and as archbishop of the archdiocese from 1981 to 2004.

Piccinini died from COVID-19 in 2020.

Notes

1929 births
2020 deaths
21st-century Roman Catholic archbishops in Brazil
Salesian bishops
20th-century Roman Catholic archbishops in Brazil
Roman Catholic bishops of Cuiabá
Roman Catholic archbishops of Cuiabá
Deaths from the COVID-19 pandemic in Mato Grosso